Ecuador at the Pan American Games.

Medal count

References

External links
COE - Comite Olimpico de Ecuador Official site.